
American Airmotive was founded in Miami, Florida in 1954 to remanufacture surplus military Boeing Stearman trainers as agricultural aircraft, the NA-75. The firm performed these conversions, as well as supplying conversions in kit form.

Aircraft

References
 

Defunct aircraft manufacturers of the United States
Manufacturing companies based in Miami
Defunct manufacturing companies based in Florida